John T. Hamlett was a government official, state legislator, and mining industry leader in Virginia. He was elected to the Virginia Senate after the death of James W. D. Bland on April 27, 1870 in a state capitol building collapse. He represented Charlotte County and Prince Edward County.

He was involved in the mining business.

References

19th-century American politicians
Virginia state senators
Year of birth missing
Year of death missing